Events in the year 1862 in India.

Incumbents
Charles Canning, Viceroy
James Bruce, 8th Earl of Elgin, Viceroy (from 21 March)

Events
2 July – Calcutta High Court is established under the High Courts Act, 1861.
 Fort George in Bombay (now Mumbai) is destroyed

Law
Indian Stock Transfer Act (British statute)
Habeas Corpus Act (British statute)
Fine Arts Copyright Act (British statute)

Births
Binodini Dasi, actress and writer (died 1941).

Deaths
 7 November – Bahadur Shah II, deposed King of Delhi, in Rangoon, Burma (born 24 October 1775)

 
India
Years of the 19th century in India